Jamal Lewis may refer to:
 Jamal Lewis (American football) (born 1979), American football running back
 Jamal Lewis (footballer) (born 1998), football left back